Familiar Linux is a discontinued Linux distribution for iPAQ devices and other personal digital assistants (PDAs), intended as a replacement for Windows CE. It can use OPIE or GPE Palmtop Environment as the graphical user interface.

Technical details 
It is loosely based on the Debian ARM distribution, but uses the ipkg package manager. It contained Python and XFree86.

History 
In May 2000, Alexander Guy took a kernel that had been worked on by Compaq programmers, built a complete Linux distribution around it, and released the first version of Familiar (v0.1).

The first version was released in May 2000.

It was developed as part of the Handhelds.org project.

Reception 
According to a 2004 review by IBM developerWorks, Familiar Linux needed more polish and "could gain mass acceptance if a dual-boot procedure were made possible".

References

External links 

 
Linux.com interview with the original author

Linux
ARM Linux distributions
Linux distributions